Serzhik, go away! ( Serzhik, herrats’ir) is a political slogan of the Armenian opposition which was spread since 2008 when Serzh Sargsyan already had been the President of Armenia about a year.

This slogan firstly was sounded on the meeting of The Armenian National Congress, but after some time it has become non-partial and now it's very popular among the all political parties and the whole people, including the veterans of the Artsakh Liberation War.

This slogan also is fairly common in the Armenian diaspora. It has been used in Strasbourg, Prague, Paris, Los Angeles etc.

According to the director of the Armenian center of strategic and national researches Manvel Sarkisyan, «Serzhik, go away!» slogan purchased the universal character against economical and social-political stagnation.

References 

Political catchphrases
Politics of Armenia